Evoga Entertainment (Evoga is the acronym of "EVOlution GAmes") was a Mexican video game company.

History 
Evoga Entertainment began operations in 2000. It was the first Latin American company to focus solely on making video games. The company had headquarters in Mexico City and in Osaka.

The company's most widely known game was Rage of the Dragons, in which Evoga planned and designed both the game and the characters, and handing off development to the Noise Factory in Japan and publishing to SNK Playmore. This was also the first Japanese-Mexican collaboration of its kind. Evoga originally envisioned Rage of the Dragons as a sequel to the Neo Geo fighting game version of Double Dragon released in 1995, but the studio never obtained the rights and thus developed a knock-off version. The staff also developed games for casinos and mobile platforms.

Evoga began bankruptcy procedures and ceased operations in 2004.

In May 2020, Piko Interactive acquired the rights of Rage of the Dragons.

Games
 Evolution Soccer (2001) - Arcade (BrezzaSoft Crystal System);
 Rage of the Dragons (2002) - Arcade (SNK Multi Video System), and Neo Geo. - co-developed with Noise Factory

Cancelled Games
Rage of the Dragons 2 (200?) - Arcade (Fighting)
The King of basketball? (200?) - Arcade (Basketball game with the characters of The King of Fighters) with a Street Slam style)
Geometrics (200?) - Arcade (Platformer)
Rage of the Dragons (200?) - PlayStation 2 port
ES: Evolution Soccer Club edition (2007) - Arcade / Crystal System

See also
 Noise Factory
 SNK Playmore

References

External links
 Official Page (archived)
 

Video game companies established in 2000
Video game companies disestablished in 2004
Defunct video game companies of Mexico